Scott Snibbe (born 1969 in New York City) is an interactive media artist, entrepreneur, and meditation instructor who is currently the host of A Skeptic's Path to Enlightenment meditation podcast. He has collaborated with other artists and musicians, including Björk on her interactive “app album” Björk: Biophilia that was acquired by New York's MoMA as the first downloadable app in the museum's collection. Between 2000 and 2013 he founded several companies, including Eyegroove, which was acquired by Facebook in 2016. Early in his career, Snibbe was one of the developers of After Effects (acquired by Adobe).

Career

Digital Art and Augmented Reality Installations 
Snibbe is one of the first artists to work with interactive projections, where computer vision is used to change a projection on a wall or floor  in response to people interacting with its surface. Snibbe's first, and best-known installation Boundary Functions (1998), premiered at Ars Electronica 1998. In this floor-projected interactive artwork, people walk across a four-meter by four-meter floor. As they move, Boundary Functions uses a camera, computer and projector to draw lines between all of the people on the floor, forming a Voronoi Diagram. This diagram has particularly strong significance when drawn around people's bodies, surrounding each person with lines that outline his or her personal space - the space closer to that person than to anyone else. Snibbe states that this work "shows that personal space, though we call it our own, is only defined by others and changes without our control".

Snibbe's first public interactive work was a networked communication system for abstract animation called Motion Phone, which won a Prix Ars Electronica award in 1996 and established him as a contributor to the field.

Snibbe's interactive installations have been shown at the Whitney Museum of American Art (New York), San Francisco Museum of Modern Art (California), The Kitchen (New York), Eyebeam (New York), the NTT InterCommunication Center (Tokyo, Japan) and the Institute of Contemporary Arts (London, UK). His work is also shown and collected by science museums, including the Exploratorium (San Francisco, CA), the New York Hall of Science (Queens, NY), the Museum of Science and Industry (Chicago, IL), the Cité des Sciences et de l'Industrie (Paris, France), the London Science Museum (UK), and the Phaeno Science Center (Germany).  A profile of his work was featured on a December 18, 2011 episode of CNN's The Next List with Dr. Sanjay Gupta.

In 2011, via his company Snibbe Interactive, Snibbe produced a series of interactive exhibits that brought technologies and experiences of James Cameron's Avatar to life in the traveling AVATAR: The Exhibition, which was funded and premiered at Seattle's Experience Music Project and Science Fiction Museum. The exhibition included full-body motion tracking augmented reality and virtual reality experiences simulating the world of Avatar's Pandora, and the process of creating the film.

App Art 
Snibbe created some of the first interactive art apps for iOS devices (iPhone, iPad, and iPod Touch). His first three apps—Gravilux, Bubble Harp, and Antograph—released in May, 2010 as iOS ports of screen-based artwork from the 1990s Dynamic Systems Series, all rose into the top ten in the iTunes Store's Entertainment section, and have been downloaded over a million times.

Snibbe collaborated with Björk to produce Biophilia, the first full-length app album, which was released for iPad and iPhone in 2011, as well as producing the visuals for her Biophilia Concert Tour. Other interactive song apps and app albums followed, including the Philip Glass: REWORK App based on the album produced by Beck, the METRIC: Synthetica App based on Metric's 2013 album, and the Passion Pit Gossamer App.

An interview with Snibbe about his work with Björk on Biophilia can be found in the 2013 BBC Documentary When Björk Met Attenborough.

Teaching, Education, and Research 

Snibbe has taught media art, animation, and computer science at UC Berkeley, NYU's Courant Institute of Mathematics, California Institute of the Arts, and the San Francisco Art Institute. He serves as an advisor to The Institute for the Future and The Sundance Institute.

Snibbe teaches mediation and leads meditation retreats, and trained in the Tibetan Buddhist tradition with teachers from The Foundation for the Preservation of the Mahayana Tradition (FPMT) including Geshe Ngawang Dakpa, the Dalai Lama, and Lama Zopa Rinpoche. In 2020 he launched the meditation podcast A Skeptic's Path to Enlightenment, that adapts the Tibetan Buddhist Lamrim and Mind Training techniques to a secular audience.

Snibbe received undergraduate and master's degrees in computer science and fine art from Brown University, where he studied with Dr. Andries van Dam and Dr. John Hughes. Snibbe studied animation at the Rhode Island School of Design with Amy Kravitz. After making several hand-drawn animated shorts, he turned to interactive art as his primary artistic medium.

At the CHI 2009 conference, Snibbe presented "Social Immersive Media," a research paper published via his nonprofit research organization Sona Research, coining the term Social Immersive Media to describe interface techniques immersive augmented reality interactive experiences focused on social interaction, and winning the best paper of conference award.

In November, 2013 Snibbe and Jaz Banga debated Laura Sydell and Christopher M. Kelty in an Oxford style debate entitled, Patent Pending: Does the U.S. Patent System stifle innovation?

Technology Entrepreneur 
Snibbe worked as a Computer Scientist at Adobe Systems from 1994 to 1996, on the special effects and animation software Adobe After Effects, named on six patents for work in animation, interface, and motion tracking. He was an employee at Paul Allen's Interval Research from 1996 to 2000 where he worked on computer vision, computer graphics, interactive music, and haptics research projects.

Snibbe was the founder of Snibbe Interactive (2007), which distributed and developed immersive interactive experiences for museums, entertainment and branding; Scott Snibbe Studio (2011) which produces original apps and apps made in collaboration with other musicians and filmmakers; and the nonprofit research organization Sona Research, which researched the socially beneficial applications of interactive technologies with grants from the National Science Foundation.

In 2013, Snibbe founded Eyegroove, a social network for creating and sharing short music videos on mobile phones. The app was a precursor to more popular services musical.ly and TikTok, and was acquired by Facebook in 2016. Post-Acquisition, Facebook integrated Eyegroove's real-time video effect technology into Instagram, Messenger, Facebook, and WhatsApp's new camera and visual sharing features released in 2017 to compete with Snapchat. Snibbe subsequently joined Facebook's Building 8 team, which was later renamed Portal after the group's first product release, and worked there until 2019 creating new augmented reality hardware and software products for the home.

Awards and Grants 
Snibbe has received several awards including the Webby Award and Prix Ars Electronica; and grants from the Rockefeller Foundation, The Ford Foundation, the National Endowment for the Arts, and The National Science Foundation.

Notable artworks
Interactive Art for the Screen
Motion Sketch, 1989
Motion Phone, 1994
Bubble Harp, 1997
Gravilux, 1997
Myrmegraph, 1998
Emptiness is Form, 2000

iPhone and iPad Apps
Gravilux, 2010
Bubble Harp, 2010
Antograph, 2010
Tripolar, 2011
OscilloScoop, 2011

Interactive Projections
Boundary Functions, 1998
Shadow, 2002
Deep Walls, 2002
Shy, 2003
Impression, 2003
Depletion, 2003
Compliant, 2003
Concentration, 2003
Cause and Effect, 2004
Visceral Cinema: Chien, 2005
Shadow Bag, 2005
Central Mosaic, 2005
Outward Mosaic, 2006
Make Like a Tree, 2006
Falling Girl, 2008

Electromechanical Sculpture
Mirror, 2001
Circular Breathing, 2002
Blow Up, 2005

Internet Art
It's Out, 2001
Tripolar, 2002
Fuel, 2002
Cabspotting, 2005

Public Art Installations
You Are Here, New York Hall of Science, 2004
Women Hold up Half the Sky, Mills College, 2007
Transit, Los Angeles International Airport, 2009

Performance
In the Grace of the World, Saint Luke's Orchestra, 2008

Film
Lost Momentum, 1995
Brothers, 1990

See also
 Interactive art
 Electronic art
 Computer art
 Software art
 Abstract film

References

Sources
 Paul, Christiane (2003). Digital Art (World of Art series). London: Thames & Hudson. .
 Wilson, Steve Information Arts: Intersections of Art, Science, and Technology 
 Bullivant, Lucy (2006). Responsive Environments: architecture, art and design (V&A Contemporaries). London:Victoria and Albert Museum. .
 Fiona Whitton, Tom Leeser, Christiane Paul (2005). Visceral Cinema: Chien. Los Angeles: Telic. ASIN: B000BFHTOE.
 ''Better Living through Chemistry'', San Francisco Examiner, November 8, 2001.
 KQED TV documentary on Scott Snibbe, original airdate: April 2005
 Scott Snibbe Studio website

External links
 KQED TV documentary on Scott Snibbe, original airdate: April 2005
 Artist's website

American digital artists
Internet art
New media artists
Buddhist artists
Living people
Interactive art
1969 births
Brown University alumni
Artists from the San Francisco Bay Area